The  is a women's professional wrestling championship owned by the Tokyo Joshi Pro Wrestling (TJPW). The title, which is situated at the top of TJPW's championship hierarchy, was introduced on October 12, 2015, and the inaugural champion was crowned on January 4, 2016, when Miyu Yamashita defeated Shoko Nakajima.

Like most professional wrestling championships, the title is won as a result of a scripted match. , there have been twelve reigns shared among seven wrestlers. Mizuki is the current champion in her first reign.

Title history

Names

Reigns

Combined reigns 

References

External links 
TJPW official site, in Japanese

Women's professional wrestling championships
Tokyo Joshi Pro-Wrestling